Shorne Wood Country Park is located between Strood and Gravesend, in the English county of Kent. It was once part of a large estate,  later passed to the county council to be used as a country park.

History
This park was once part of the large Cobham Hall Estate. The main entrance to the Hall, leads through the park with various other carriage rides around the estate.
Then from the 1930s to the 1970s, part of the estate (was leased by Lord Darnley) was used for clay extraction (by a cement company), using clay pit beneath the ancient woodland.

Facilities
It has large areas of ancient woodland and heathland meadows. The former claypit is being returned to nature (with woodland and wetland areas).
The wetland ponds have many species of dragonflies, which breed in the park. A large part of the park is a Site of Special Scientific Interest (SSSI) with the designation Shorne and Ashenbank Woods. 

The park also is accredited with a Green Flag Award by Natural England.

The country park has many colour-coded waymarked paths around the country park. These include; Purple Route - Easy 1.4 km, Red Route - Medium, Explorer Trail - 3.7miles, Heritage Trail - 2.2miles. A longer trail (the Darmley Trail - 6.2miles) has also been developed taking area outside of Shorne Wood park, including Darnley Mausoleum, Jeskyns (a one-time farm of 360 acres (147 ha), which is being turned into a greenspace area and country park by the Forestry Commission ), Ranscombe Farm and Cobham Hall. 

There is also a horse riding and cycle path route around the park. As well as a Sensory Garden for the less abled. 
Disabled visitors can also use 4*4 electro-scooters (called a Tramper), which can be hired from the visitor centre.

The park also has an eco-friendly visitor centre designed by Lee Evans Partnership and costing £1.6m. It as runner up in 2007 Kent Design Awards. It was the first structure to be constructed using Sweet chestnut in the UK. The mainly sweetchestnut structure, also used Oak thinnings were used from Park Wood, Kent near Appledore, as the window and roof joinery.

It is mostly powered by a wind turbine. The centre has a shop, display boards and cafe.

To the east of the park, are the Furzey Leas Lakes.

Since 2006, the park has had a Community Archaeologist as funded by the Heritage Lottery. Finds from the Stone Age (flint tools) to World War II items have been found. Most work has been taken place around the remains of Randall Manor. This was the home of Sir Henry de Cobham who lived there in 1360 to 1400. The house would have been similar to Ightham Mote but without a moat. The excavations show that it was a substantial timber-framed hall house with a stone built end. It had a garderobe and a separate kitchen making it a high status building. It had outbuildings and three fishponds. It was demolished in 1500 and the building materials re-used in the nearby Cobham Hall, now a girls' school.

More details of what was found in the park can be seen at the Kent County Council website.
One of the '100 Walks in Kent' Book starts in the country park, before heading towards Owletts (a National Trust House), Cobham and Cobham Hall and then returning to the park.

How to get there
Situated off the A2 Dual carriageway between Gravesend and Rochester. The main entrance for cars is along Brewer's Road leading to Shorne.

Parkrun
Shorne Woods Country park is also home to a parkrun which is a free timed 5k event fully staffed by volunteers. The first Shorne Woods parkrun took place on 30 March 2013.

Images

References

External links

Kent Country page
Kent Downs page
Shorne Woods parkrun

Country parks in Kent
Parks and open spaces in Kent
Gravesham